Nicholas Matthew  (born 25 July 1980 in Sheffield) is a former English professional squash player who has won the two most prestigious tournaments in the professional game, the British Open and the World Open, three times each. He reached a career-high world ranking of World No. 1 in June 2010. His home club is Hallamshire Tennis and Squash Club in Sheffield which has named 'The Nick Matthew Showcourt' after him.

He married Esme Taylor, a sports physiologist who has worked with British Cycling, in 2013 and the couple celebrated the birth of their first child Charlotte Rose on 9 September 2014.

Career overview
Nick Matthew, who attended High Storrs School, first came to the squash world's attention as an outstanding junior player. He was the 1999 British Junior Open under-19 champion, a semi-finalist at the 1998 World Junior Championships, and a member of the England team which won the 1998 world junior team title. He made his first appearance on the professional tour in 1998.

In 2006, Matthew became the first English player to win the British Open men's title since 1939. In the final, against Thierry Lincou of France, he came back from 0–4 down in the fifth game to win 11–8, 5–11, 11–4, 9–11, 11–6. In 2007, Matthew won the US Open title, beating James Willstrop in the final 11–7, 11–4, 11–7.

Matthew won the British National Championship title in 2006 and 2009. In 2006, Matthew played Lee Beachill in a tight final, which he won 11–9, 6–11, 11–9, 10–12, 12–10. In 2009, he defeated Adrian Grant in the final 11–4, 11–3, 11–9. Matthew was a member of the England team which won the World Team Squash Championships in 2005 and 2007.

2009 saw Matthew soar up in rankings to world No. 4 in December. His best achievement of the year is by winning the Qatar Classic Open title in November. In the Saudi International Open, Matthew's fine run was halted by Ramy Ashour who beat him in the final that decided the next world No. 1. Matthew lost in 110 minutes in a gruelling 5-game match.

In June 2010, Matthew topped the world rankings for the first time.

In the men's singles final of the 2010 Commonwealth Games in Delhi, Matthew defeated compatriot James Willstrop 11–6, 11–7, 11–7 in 66 minutes to win the gold medal.

December 2010 Matthew won the World Open Squash Men's Title, becoming the first Englishman in the premier event's 35-year history to win the PSA World Championship

Matthew won the PSA 2010 World Open, defeating James Willstrop of England in the final by 3 games to 1 in 74 minutes at The Sunset Beach Resort in Saudi Arabia on Friday 10 December 2010.

Matthew won the PSA 2011 World Open, defeating Grégory Gaultier of France in the final by 3 games to 1 in 92 minutes at the Luxor Theatre in Rotterdam, The Netherlands on Sunday 6 November 2011.
After struggling with an injury in late 2011, Matthew entered the J.P. Morgan Tournament of Champions, beating then world number 1 James Willstrop. He has since regained his position as world number 1.

He won his 3rd British Open title on 20 May 2012, becoming the first Englishman to win the title three times in the professional era.

Matthew won his third PSA 2013 World Open, defeating Grégory Gaultier of France in the final by 3 games to 2 in 111 minutes in the Central arena Manchester, England on Sunday 3 November 2013. The 33-year-old world number one from Sheffield joined a select and distinguished group of players – Australian Geoff Hunt; Pakistanis Jahangir Khan and Jansher Khan; and Egyptian Amr Shabana – who have three world titles to their name.

In February 2014, Matthew won a record sixth British National title with victory over fellow Englishman James Willstrop in the final before getting the better of Willstrop once more in the final of the Canary Wharf Classic to win his fourth title at the London event.

2014 saw more 2014 Commonwealth Games success for Matthew despite a knee injury, sustained in training, which overshadowed his preparations. Matthew carried the baton through his native Sheffield before the Games and was then chosen by his teammates to be flag bearer for Team England at the opening ceremony at Celtic Park in Glasgow.

In competition, Matthew competed in singles and doubles with Adrian Grant. He won Gold in singles courtesy of a 11–9 8–11 11–5 6–11 11–5 over James Willstrop in what was described as an 'absorbing contest', shown live on BBC Television. He and Grant then took silver in the doubles after falling 10–11 11–7 11–9 to Australians Cameron Pilley and David Palmer.

2015 has proved to be another successful year for Matthew. He became the first man since Ramy Ashour in 2013 to win three PSA World Tour titles in a row when he followed victories in the Swedish Open and Windy City Open with a record-breaking fifth Canary Wharf Classic trophy.

Matthew has had continued success in 2016, despite bad luck with injuries and illness at key times of the season. He won a record eighth title at the British National championships in Manchester in February, beating his long-time rival James Willstrop 11-2 6-11 11-3 11-3 and dropping only one game all week.

On the PSA World Tour, he was runner-up to World No.1 Mohamad El Shorbagy in three prestigious finals. At January's J.P Morgan Tournament of Champions, played in the iconic Grand Central station, Elshorbagy defeated Matthew 8-11 11-6 11-8 6-11 11-6 in the final.

In March, Matthew met El Shorbagy again in the final of the Windy City Open before injury prevented him from completing the match.

In October's Delaware Investments US Open once again saw a potentially epic encounter brought to an early end as Matthew was forced to retire in the fifth game.

Off-Court
Matthew launched the Nick Matthew Academy in February 2016, based in Sheffield and run in association with the One Health Group. The Academy has the goal of coaching and nurturing the next generation of English squash players and has created a pathway to help children go from beginners to elite players.

As well as his association with the One Health Group (which works with the NHS to treat patients referred by their GP for orthopaedics, spine, general surgery and gynaecology), Matthew also works with a range of commercial partners: AJ Bell (a financial and investment services provider); equipment suppliers Dunlop, Hi-Tec, 2-Undr and Trion-Z; Rowe Motor Oil; FairBriar International; Benz Bavarian (which supplies his Mercedes car); Netsuite; Sea Island Resort and Squash and Beyond squash camps. He is also supported national governing body England Squash.

Matthew has been a patron of the Sheffield Children's Hospital since 2014.

In November 2016 he was named as an Athlete Ambassador for the 2018 Gold Coast Commonwealth Games by Commonwealth Games England.

World Open final appearances

3 titles and 0 runner-up

Major World Series final appearances

Australian Open: 2 finals (1 title, 1 runner-up)

British Grand Prix: 1 final (0 titles, 1 runner-up)

British Open: 5 finals (3 titles, 2 runner-up)

Hong Kong Open: 2 finals (1 title, 1 runner-up)

North American Open: 4 finals (2 titles, 2 runner-up)

PSA Masters: 2 finals (1 title, 1 runner-up)

Qatar Classic: 2 finals (1 title, 1 runner-up)

Saudi International: 1 final (0 titles, 1 runner-up)

Sky Open: 1 final (1 title, 0 runner-up)

Tournament of Champions: 6 finals (1 title, 5 runner-up)

US Open: 4 finals (1 title, 3 runner-up)

Windy City Open: 2 finals (1 title, 1 runner-up)

Career statistics

Singles performance timeline 

To prevent confusion and double counting, information in this table is updated only once a tournament or the player's participation in the tournament has concluded.

Note: NA = Not Available

See also
 Official Men's Squash World Ranking

References

Nick Matthew (Official)

Further reading

External links 

 
 
 
 
 

English male squash players
1980 births
Living people
Sportspeople from Sheffield
People educated at High Storrs School
Officers of the Order of the British Empire
Commonwealth Games gold medallists for England
Commonwealth Games medallists in squash
Squash players at the 2006 Commonwealth Games
Squash players at the 2010 Commonwealth Games
Squash players at the 2018 Commonwealth Games
World Games gold medalists
World Games bronze medalists
World Games silver medalists
Competitors at the 2005 World Games
Competitors at the 2009 World Games
Medallists at the 2010 Commonwealth Games